Oloibiri is a small community in Ogbia LGA located in Bayelsa State, in the eastern Niger Delta region of Nigeria. The inhabitants of Oloibiri community are mainly fishermen and farmers. This is the first place Oil was first discovered in Nigeria.

Oloibiri is a historic town to the oil and gas industry in Nigeria. Nigeria's first commercial oil discovery in Oloibiri town by Shell Darcy on January 15, 1956.

The discovery of oil in Oloibiri hasn't helped most Nigerians and only has led to destruction of the environment and the way of life of indigenous people of the Niger Delta.
And with an initial production of 5,000 barrels of oil per day (which would later become as much as 2,000,000), Nigeria became the 6th largest oil producer on the chart of the Organisation of petroleum Exporting Countries OPEC.

Oloibiri well was the first commercial oil well in Nigeria. Oloibiri Oilfield was the first commercial oil field in Nigeria as well as West Africa. Nigeria exported its first crude oil in February 1958 from the Oloibiri oil field. Nigeria's first crude oil export came from Oloibiri field in February 1958. Nigeria's first crude oil pipeline was laid from Oloibiri oil field to Port Harcourt on the Bonny River (Bonny Export Terminal).

Current state

Inasmuch as Oloibiri town was the 'birthplace' of oil in Nigeria, it is a sight for sore eyes. The place is under-developed, the people are poor peasants, the epidemic rate is off the charts, the unemployment rate is alarming, and their land has suffered deadly blows from oil spills. The oil in Oloibiri has since dried up but there is nothing to show that it was the place where Nigeria's oil breakthrough started. In plain terms, it could be said that the town of Oloibiri was used and 'dumped' after the oil explorers found no more use for it. The Federal Government of Nigeria once promised to build a museum in Oloibiri, but till date, that promise has not been fulfilled.

References

 60 Years After Nigeria's Crude. Vanguard Nigeria.  Retrieved on October 10, 2016.
 Oloibiri: Where It All Began.  Leadership Newspaper. Retrieved on October 10, 2016.

Populated places in Bayelsa State